800 Meters is a 2022 Netflix docuseries about the 2017 Barcelona attacks, directed by Elías León Siminiani. The series consists of three parts.

Episodes

Production
Over 200 hours of footage were filmed for this project, and around 80 interview were done.

References

External links
 
 

2020s Spanish television series
2022 Spanish television series debuts
Spanish-language Netflix original programming
Netflix original documentary television series